Kim Min-seok (born 9 February 1993) is a South Korean Greco-Roman wrestler. He won one of the bronze medals in the 130 kg event at the 2018 World Wrestling Championships held in Budapest, Hungary. In 2018, he also won one of the bronze medals in the 130 kg event at the Asian Games held in Jakarta, Indonesia.

Career 

He competed in the 130 kg event at the 2017 World Wrestling Championships held in Paris, France where he was eliminated in his first match.

In 2020, he won the silver medal in the 130 kg event at the Asian Wrestling Championships held in New Delhi, India.

In 2021, he competed in the men's 130 kg event at the 2020 Summer Olympics held in Tokyo, Japan.

He won the silver medal in his event at the 2022 Asian Wrestling Championships held in Ulaanbaatar, Mongolia. He competed in the 130kg event at the 2022 World Wrestling Championships held in Belgrade, Serbia.

Major results

References

External links 
 

Living people
1993 births
Place of birth missing (living people)
South Korean male sport wrestlers
World Wrestling Championships medalists
Wrestlers at the 2018 Asian Games
Asian Games medalists in wrestling
Asian Games bronze medalists for South Korea
Medalists at the 2018 Asian Games
Asian Wrestling Championships medalists
Wrestlers at the 2020 Summer Olympics
Olympic wrestlers of South Korea
21st-century South Korean people